James Tuck may refer to:
 James Tuck (archaeologist) (1940–2019), Canadian archaeologist
 James L. Tuck (1910–1980), British physicist
 James Tuck (cricketer) (1853–1918), English cricketer
 James Tuck (Canadian football) (born 1990), Canadian football player